John Maclean is a Scottish film director, screenwriter and musician.  He is best known for writing and directing the 2015 film Slow West.

Career

Maclean obtained his bachelor's degree (BA) in drawing and painting from Edinburgh College of Art, and his master's degree (MA) from The Royal College of Art in London. After college, he delivered cars by driving them to their new owners around America; seeing so much of the country later inspired his interest to make a Western.

Maclean was a founding member of the Scottish indie-rock groups The Beta Band from 1997 to 2004 and The Aliens from 2005 to 2008. He also directed music videos for these bands, as well as the video for Hand of Man, Django Django's 2013 single. David Maclean, John's brother, is Django Django's drummer and producer.  Those videos came to the attention of Michael Fassbender, who agreed to be involved in a 2009 short film Man on a Motorcycle, and later in Slow West.  The Guardian described the partnership between Maclean and Fassbender as "not quite up there with Scorsese/De Niro yet, but a good start".

Maclean is the son of Scottish artists Marian Leven and Will Maclean.

Filmography

Film

Reception
Reviewing Slow West, the Village Voice concluded that "Maclean is a supremely promising talent."

Maclean won a Best Short Film BAFTA award in 2012 for Pitch Black Heist, which starred Michael Fassbender and Liam Cunningham. His first feature film was the 2015 western-drama Slow West. He won the "World Cinema Jury Prize: Dramatic" at the 2015 Sundance Film Festival. The same year, BAFTA named him as a "Brit to Watch".

References

External links
 

Year of birth missing (living people)
Living people
Scottish film directors
Scottish keyboardists
Scottish folk singers
British music video directors
People educated at Madras College